The Game of Truth (French: Le jeu de la vérité) is a 1961 French mystery film directed by Robert Hossein and starring Hossein,  Françoise Prévost and Paul Meurisse.

Cast
  Robert Hossein as L'inspecteur de police  
 Françoise Prévost as Guylaine  
 Paul Meurisse as Portrant 
 Jean Servais as Jean-François Vérate  
 Nadia Gray as Solange Vérate  
 Tiny Yong as Girl  
 Perrette Pradier as Florence  
 Jeanne Valérie as Françoise Bribant  
 Georges Rivière as Bertrand Falaise  
 Jean-Louis Trintignant as Guy de Fleury  
 Jacques Dacqmine as Guillaume Geder  
 Marc Cassot as Etienne Bribant  
 Daliah Lavi as Gisèle

References

Bibliography 
 Philippe Rège. Encyclopedia of French Film Directors, Volume 1. Scarecrow Press, 2009.

External links 
 

1961 films
French mystery films
1960s mystery films
1960s French-language films
Films directed by Robert Hossein
1960s French films